The Spokane Public Library - Heath Branch is a historic building in the Logan neighborhood of Spokane, Washington. It was designed by architect Julius Zittel, and built in 1914 with $35,000 from Andrew Carnegie. It has been listed on the National Register of Historic Places since August 3, 1982.

References

	
National Register of Historic Places in Spokane County, Washington
Libraries on the National Register of Historic Places in Washington (state)
Library buildings completed in 1914
Carnegie libraries in Washington (state)